Sohier is a surname. Notable people with the surname include:

Alice Ruggles Sohier (1880–1969), American artist
Edward Dexter Sohier (1810–1888), American lawyer
Elizabeth Putnam Sohier (1847–1926), American philanthropist
Hector Sohier, Normand architect
Sage Sohier, American photographer and educator